Marcus R. Burrowes  (1874–1953) was a notable Detroit architect. He served one year in the position of president of the Michigan Society of Architects and was a fellow of the American Institute of Architects (AIA). He was widely known in southeast Michigan, especially during the second and third decades of the twentieth century, for his recreation of English Revival style buildings.

Biography
Burrowes was born in Tonawanda, New York, near Buffalo. Burrowes attended the Denver Art Academy, where he attended lectures and received instruction by architects of note, as well as serving an apprenticeship to a leading architectural firm in Denver. In the 1890s, Burrowes work took him to Canada, where he was employed in the chief architects office of the Dominion at Ottawa, specializing in post office buildings. From Canada, he crossed the Detroit River to Detroit, a place suitable for an entrepreneurial architect like Burrowes.

Initially, Burrowes worked in the offices of Albert Kahn. In 1907, he joined the firm of Stratton and Baldwin for two years, which put him into contact with leading figures in the Arts and Crafts movement in Detroit, including Kahn, William B. Stratton, Frank C. Baldwin, and George Gough Booth. Through Stratton's connections with Mary Chase Perry Stratton of Pewabic Pottery, Burrowes gained exposure to this important Detroit-based firm as well.

However, deciding his future was to be in independent practice, Burrowes formed the firm of Burrowes and Wells with Dalton R. Wells. By 1914, Burrowes was operating under his own name. In 1920 he joined with Frank Eurich, who had received training in the architecture program from Cornell University. Together, Burrowes and Eurich designed many homes in Grosse Pointe and Detroit, as well as several libraries and municipal buildings.

During his lifetime, Burrowes was recognized by his fellow architects. He served as president of the Detroit Chapter of the American Institute of Architects in 1916 and 1917; vice-president of the Detroit Chapter in 1923, and secretary from 1911 to 1915. He served as president of the Michigan Society of Architects in 1923 and 1924. In 1940, he was made a Fellow of the American Institute of Architects and became Emeritus in 1952. He was a member of the Episcopal Church and the Detroit Athletic Club.

Burrowes died at the age of 79 at his home in London, Ontario, which he had retired to eight months previous. His obituary in the Detroit Free Press in 1953, stated how "he designed more than 1,000 structures in and near Detroit during his long career."

Selected commissions

Libraries
 Gabriel Richard Library, Stoepel and Grand River, Detroit
 Redford Village Hall (Redford Library), Six Mile and Grand River, 1928
 Duffield Branch of the Detroit Public Library, 2507 West Grand Boulevard and Dunelin
 Francis Parkman Branch of the Detroit Public Library, 1726 Oakman, Blvd, Detroit, 1931
 McGregor Library, Woodward Avenue, Highland Park (Local associated architects. Building designed by Tilton  & Githens of New York)

Schools and Civic Complexes
 Wayne County Training School, near Northville
 Barber School, Highland Park
 Highland Park Athletic Fieldhouse, Highland Park
 Grosse Pointe High School, Grosse Pointe Farms
 Grosse Pointe Cottage School, Grosse Pointe
 Grosse Pointe Hunt Club Clubhouse, Grosse Pointe
 Grosse Pointe Golf Clubhouse, Grosse Pointe
 Peoples' State Bank, Detroit
 Remodeling of Greenmeade, Eight Mile Road, Livonia
 Grand Lawn Cemetery entrance, Grand River just east of Telegraph Road
 Methodist Children's Village, Six Mile Road, Redford
 YMCA, Highland Park
 YWCA, Highland Park
 Grosse Pointe Municipal Building
 Springwells Town Hall, later Dearborn City Hall
 Birmingham Civic Complex, Birmingham, 1921-1922

Starr Commonwealth, outside Albion, Michigan
Design of 11 buildings and campus landscape plan

 Newton Hall, Starr Commonwealth, 1915
 Emily Jewell Clark Building, Starr Commonwealth, 1917
 Wilcox Cottage, Starr Commonwealth
 Hillside, later Payne Family Cottage, Starr Commonwealth, 1920
 Webster Hall, Starr Commonwealth, 1934
 Inglis-Medelssohn Cottage, Starr Commonwealth
 Chapel in the Woods, Starr Commonwealth, 1949
 Breuckner Museum and Art Gallery, Starr Commonwealth, 1952
 Designs for Candler Hall, Kresge Cottage, Norton Family Cottage, Starr Commonwealth - all built after Burrowes death

References
Fox, Jean M. "Marcus Burrowes, English Revival Architect", Monograph #2, Farmington Hills Historical Commission, 1992.

Wilson, Tim   Wayne County Training School

Preserve Detroit, [www.preservedetroit.com]

External links

1874 births
1953 deaths
20th-century American architects
Architects from Detroit
American expatriates in Canada
Fellows of the American Institute of Architects